George E. Stone  (born Gerschon Lichtenstein; May 18, 1903 – May 26, 1967) was a Polish-born American character actor in films, radio, and television.

Life and career

Stone was born Gerschon Lichtenstein in Łódź, Congress Poland, into a Jewish family. He sailed from the Port of Hamburg, Germany, as a steerage passenger on board the S/S President Grant, which arrived at the Port of New York on May 29, 1913; at Ellis Island, he passed federal immigrant inspection with his two sisters and a brother.

As an actor, Stone first attracted attention (as "Georgie Stone") in the 1927 silent film 7th Heaven, where he played the local street thug The Sewer Rat; audiences remembered his slight build and very expressive face. He made a successful transition to talking pictures in Warner Bros.' Tenderloin, speaking in a pleasant, slightly nasal tenor. Stone was then typecast in streetwise roles, often playing a Runyonesque mobster or a gangland boss's assistant, notably as Rico Bandello's right-hand man Otero in the gangster classic Little Caesar (1931). He adopted a dapper pencil moustache for these screen roles. One of his most famous appearances was in the classic musical 42nd Street (1933), in which wiseguy Stone assesses a promiscuous chorus girl: "She only said 'no' once, and then she didn't hear the question!" His one starring film (as George E. Stone) was the Universal Pictures gangster comedy The Big Brain (1933).

In 1939, comedy producer Hal Roach hired Stone for his film The Housekeeper's Daughter. It was a difficult role: Stone had to play a mentally impaired murderer in a sweet natured and sympathetic manner. Stone went clean-shaven, emphasizing a boyish, innocent look, and played the part so sensitively that Roach often cast him in other films. In 1942, Stone burlesqued Hirohito in Roach's wartime comedy The Devil with Hitler. Stone repeated his Japanese characterization, this time dramatically, in the 1942 film Little Tokyo, U.S.A.; he played the Japanese agent, Kingoro.

George E. Stone's most familiar role was "The Runt", loyal sidekick to adventurous ex-criminal Boston Blackie in Columbia Pictures' action-comedy series. Stone was supposed to perform with Chester Morris in the first film of the series, Meet Boston Blackie, but was sidelined by a virus. Actor Charles Wagenheim filled in for him, and Stone joined the series in the second entry, Confessions of Boston Blackie. Stone's performances in the Blackies were well received, and he enthusiastically played scenes for laughs, doing dialects, disguising in women's clothes, posing as a child, or reacting in wide-eyed amazement or frustration to each story's twists and turns. Both Chester Morris and George E. Stone reprised their screen roles for one year in the Boston Blackie radio series. Illness struck Stone again in 1948, forcing him to bow out of the last Boston Blackie picture, Boston Blackie's Chinese Venture (released in 1949); he was replaced by Sid Tomack.

Even in his smallest roles, Stone made an impression. In the 1945 newspaper-themed feature Midnight Manhunt, he plays a murder victim who doesn't say a word but expires eloquently. Another tiny role has Stone contributing to the perennial holiday favorite Miracle on 34th Street – but not in the film. He appears in the coming-attractions trailer, as an openly cynical screenwriter confronted by a bossy movie producer.

Stone made guest appearances in movies and television through the 1950s, in situation comedies (The George Burns and Gracie Allen Show) and action-adventure shows (Adventures of Superman, as mob leader "Big George"). When it came to playing tough guys, Stone could be just as convincing as the biggest, brawniest men. In the feature film The Man with the Golden Arm, Stone is the vindictive mobster who has been cheated at cards, and attacks dealer Frank Sinatra's friend Arnold Stang in a brutal fistfight.

Stone's vision deteriorated in the late 1950s, limiting him to walk-on roles or undemanding character parts. He played nervous stool pigeon "Toothpick Charlie" in Billy Wilder's comedy hit Some Like It Hot, and became a TV regular in the popular Perry Mason series, appearing in 44 episodes in the minor role of the court clerk, and two additional episodes in other roles.

One of Stone's closest friends was reporter-humorist Damon Runyon. Stone often appeared in movie adaptations of Runyon's work. In Stone's last film, Pocketful of Miracles (1961), directed by Frank Capra, he played the uncredited role of a blind beggar.

Illness and death
Throughout his career, Stone was sidelined by illness. In 1936, he had pneumonia and lost out on a film role. Later illnesses forced him to miss the first and the last of the Boston Blackie pictures. In the early 1950s began losing his sight to the point of almost total blindness in both eyes. He told The Daily Mirror in November 1958, “To me, it meant the end of everything I’d taken for granted.” In 1958, he underwent surgery to save his sight. In fact, his sight was so limited by the time that he played the county clerk on Perry Mason that he had to be led around the set by his co-stars.

After suffering a major stroke in 1966 which left him bedridden and unable to speak, Stone spent the majority of his last year of life at the Motion Picture Country Home until he died May 26, 1967. His resting place is at Mount Sinai Memorial Park Cemetery.

Recognition
For his contributions to motion pictures, Stone received a star on the Hollywood Walk of Fame on February 8, 1960.  The star is located at 6932 Hollywood Boulevard, between North Orange Drive and North Highland Avenue, across the street from Grauman's Chinese Theatre, now known as TCL Chinese Theatre.

Selected filmography 

 Seventh Heaven (1927) - Sewer Rat
 Brass Knuckles (1927) - Velvet Smith
 San Francisco Nights (1928) - 'Flash' Hoxy
 Turn Back the Hours (1928) - Limey
 Tenderloin (1928) - Sparrow
 The Crimson City (1928) - Slinkey 
 Walking Back (1928) - Crook (uncredited)
 Clothes Make the Woman (1928) - Assistant Director
 The Racket (1928) - Joe Scarsi 
 Beautiful But Dumb (1928) - Tad
 State Street Sadie (1928) - Slinky
 Naughty Baby (1928) - Tony Caponi
 Weary River (1929) - Blackie
 The Redeeming Sin (1929) - A Sewer Rat
 Two Men and a Maid (1929) - Shorty
 The Girl in the Glass Cage (1929) - Carlos
 Melody Lane (1929) - Danny
 Skin Deep (1929) - Dippy
 Under a Texas Moon (1930) - Pedro 
 The Medicine Man (1930) - Steve
 Little Caesar (1931) - Otero
 Cimarron (1931) - Sol Levy
 The Front Page (1931) - Earl Williams
 Maid to Order (1931)
 Five Star Final (1931) - Ziggie Feinstein
 The Spider (1931) - Dr. Blackstone
 Sob Sister (1931) - Johnnie the Sheik
 The Woman from Monte Carlo (1932) - Le Duc
 Taxi! (1932) - Skeets
 The World and the Flesh (1932) - Rutchkin
 The Last Mile (1932) - Joe Berg - Cell 1
 The Phantom of Crestwood (1932) - The Cat
 File 113 (1933) - Verduet
 The Vampire Bat (1933) - Kringen
 42nd Street (1933) - Andy Lee
 Sailor Be Good (1933) - Murphy
 Song of the Eagle (1933) - Gus
 Emergency Call (1933) - Sammie Miller
 The Wrecker (1933) - Sam Shapiro
 The Big Brain (1933) - Max Werner
 He Couldn't Take It (1933) - Sammy Kohn
 Sing Sinner Sing (1933) - Spats
 Penthouse (1933) - Murtoch
 Ladies Must Love (1933) - Joey
 King for a Night (1933) - Hymie
 Frontier Marshal (1934) - David 'Abe' Ruskin
 Viva Villa! (1934) - Emilio Chavito
 Return of the Terror (1934) - Soapy McCoy
 The Dragon Murder Case (1934) - Tatum
 Embarrassing Moments (1934) - Louie
 Secret of the Chateau (1934) - Armand
 One Hour Late (1934) - Benny
 Million Dollar Baby (1934) - Joe Lewis
 Hold 'Em Yale (1935) - Bennie South Street
 Public Hero No. 1 (1935) - Butch
 Make a Million (1935) - Larkey
 Moonlight on the Prairie (1935) - Small Change
 Frisco Kid (1935) - Solly
 Freshman Love (1936) - E. Prendergast Biddle
 Man Hunt (1936) - Silk
 Boulder Dam (1936) - Man Aiding Ann (uncredited)
 Bullets or Ballots (1936) - Wires Kagel
 Rhythm on the Range (1936) - Shorty
 Anthony Adverse (1936) - Sancho
 Jailbreak (1936) - Weeper
 Back to Nature (1936) - Mr. Sweeney (uncredited)
 Here Comes Carter (1936) - Boots Burnett
 The Captain's Kid (1936) - Steve
 Polo Joe (1936) - First Loafer
 King of Hockey (1936) - Nick Torga
 Don't Get Me Wrong (1937) - Chuck
 Clothes and the Woman (1937) - Count Bernhardt
 Back in Circulation (1937) - Mac 
 Alcatraz Island (1937) - 'Tough Tony' Burke
 The Adventurous Blonde (1937) - Pete
 A Slight Case of Murder (1938) - Kirk
 Mr. Moto's Gamble (1938) - Connors
 Over the Wall (1938) - Gyp
 You and Me (1938) - Patsy
 Submarine Patrol (1938) - Seaman Irving Goldfarb
 Long Shot (1939) - Danny Welch
 You Can't Get Away with Murder (1939) - Toad
 The Housekeeper's Daughter (1939) - Benny
 The Night of Nights (1939) - Sammy Kayn
 I Take This Woman (1940) - Sid
 Island of Doomed Men (1940) - Siggy
 Cherokee Strip (1940) - Abe Gabbert
 Slightly Tempted (1940) - Petey
 North West Mounted Police (1940) - Johnny Pelang
 The Face Behind the Mask (1941) - Dinky
 Road Show (1941) - Indian
 Broadway Limited (1941) - Lefty
 Last of the Duanes (1941) - Euchre
 Confessions of Boston Blackie (1941) - The Runt
The Lone Star Ranger (1942) - Euchre
 The Affairs of Jimmy Valentine (1942) - Mousey
 Alias Boston Blackie (1942) - The Runt
 Little Tokyo, U.S.A. (1942) - Kingoro
 Boston Blackie Goes Hollywood (1942) - The Runt
 After Midnight with Boston Blackie (1943) - The Runt
 The Chance of a Lifetime (1943) - The Runt
 Timber Queen (1944) - Squirrel
 Roger Touhy, Gangster (1944) - 'Ice Box' Hamilton
 My Buddy (1944) - Pete
 One Mysterious Night (1944) - The Runt
 Boston Blackie Booked on Suspicion (1945) - The Runt
 Scared Stiff (1945) - Mink
 Boston Blackie's Rendezvous (1945) - The Runt
 Midnight Manhunt (1945) - Joe Wells
 Doll Face (1945) - Stage Manager
 Shock (1946) - Cab Driver (uncredited)
 A Close Call for Boston Blackie (1946) - The Runt
 Sentimental Journey (1946) - Toy Hawker (uncredited)
 The Phantom Thief (1946) - The Runt
 Suspense (1946) - Max
 Boston Blackie and the Law (1946) - The Runt
 Abie's Irish Rose (1946) - Isaac Cohen
 Daisy Kenyon (1947) - Waiter (uncredited)
 Trapped by Boston Blackie (1948) - The Runt
 The Untamed Breed (1948) - Pablo
 Dancing in the Dark (1949) - Film Cutter (uncredited)
 A Girl in Every Port (1952) - Skeezer
 Bloodhounds of Broadway (1952) - Ropes McGonigle
 Tonight We Sing (1953) - Impresario (uncredited)
 Pickup on South Street (1953) - Willie - Police Desk Clerk (uncredited)
 The Robe (1953) - Gracchus (uncredited)
 Combat Squad (1953) - Medic Brown
 The Miami Story (1954) - Louie Mott
 Broken Lance (1954) - Paymaster (uncredited)
 Woman's World (1954) - Executive Reception Guest (uncredited)
 The Steel Cage (1954) - Solly, Convict Chef (segment "The Chef")
 3 Ring Circus (1954) - Little Boy's Father (uncredited)
 New York Confidential (1955) - Darlene's Agent (uncredited)
 Guys and Dolls (1955) - Society Max
 The Man With the Golden Arm (1955) - Sam Markette
 The Conqueror (1956) - Sibilant Sam (uncredited)
 Slightly Scarlet (1956) - Roos (uncredited)
 Jungle Hell (1956) - Mr. Trosk
 Sierra Stranger (1957) - Barfly Dan
 Calypso Heat Wave (1957) - Books
 The Tijuana Story (1957) - Pino
 The Story of Mankind (1957) - Waiter
 Baby Face Nelson (1957) - Mr. Hall - Bank Manager
 Some Came Running (1958) - Slim (uncredited)
 Night of the Quarter Moon (1959) - Detective (uncredited)
 Some Like it Hot (1959) - "Toothpick" Charlie
 Alias Jesse James (1959) - New York Bar Gibson Girl Fan (uncredited)
 Bells Are Ringing (1960) - Blind Bookie (uncredited)
 Ocean's 11 (1960) - Proprietor (uncredited)
 Pocketful of Miracles (1961) - Shimkey (uncredited)

References

External links

George E. Stone at Virtual History

1903 births
1967 deaths
Actors from Łódź
Congress Poland emigrants to the United States
American male film actors
American male silent film actors
20th-century American male actors
Jewish American male actors
Jews from the Russian Empire
20th-century American Jews
American Ashkenazi Jews